In the late 1960s, an independence movement was founded in Mindanao, the Philippines to separate the Muslim majority-Moro areas from the rest of the Philippines.

In late 1968, at least 28 Muslim volunteers from Sulu who were being trained for a covert mission to Sabah were massacred by Philippine Government troops of Ferdinand Marcos in the Jabidah Massacre, resulting in the most horrific state-sponsored killings against the Tausug people, a major Muslim ethnic group in the Philippines. The first organization of the independence movement was Moro National Liberation Front (MNLF) founded by Nur Misuari. Subsequent break-away groups include the Moro Islamic Liberation Front or MILF and the Bangsamoro Islamic Freedom Fighters or BIFF.

On March 27, 2014, a comprehensive peace deal was signed between the Government of the Republic of the Philippines, or GRP, and the Moro Islamic Liberation Front. This was after two decades of negotiations started during the administration of former President Fidel V. Ramos in 1997.

Beginning of independence movement 

In pursuit of their goal of “liberating” the Bangsamoro, the MNLF engaged the government forces in extensive armed collisions, peaking in the early 1970s when the rebels’ blitz-like operations brought them control of a substantial number of municipalities surrounding Cotabato City and its airport complex. This prompted the Marcos regime to beef up military presence by deploying almost three-fourths of the army in most Muslim parts of Mindanao. Things took a different turn in 1976 when Libyan leader Muammar Gaddafi brokered an agreement that led to the signing of the Tripoli Agreement that introduced the concept of an autonomous Muslim region in Mindanao. On August 1, 1989, under the mandate of the new 1987 Constitution, Congress enacted Republic Act 6734 authorizing the creation of the Autonomous Region in Muslim Mindanao (ARMM). However, out of the 13 provinces and 9 cities that participated in the plebiscite, only the provinces of Lanao del Sur, Maguindanao, Sulu and Tawi-Tawi opted to become part of the ARMM. The ARMM was formally established on November 6, 1990.

Instead of bringing the Muslim leaders together, this agreement further fragmented the MNLF because some factions within the group preferred independence over autonomy. Thus, a group of officers led by Hashim Salamat broke away and formed the Moro Islamic Liberation Front (MILF) to continue their armed struggle for an independent Bangsamoro (Moro nation) in Mindanao.

Though the combined strength of these two rebel forces has not reached a point of posing any real threat to the government in Manila, their existence—and the reasons for their resilience—certainly brings many headaches for the government. For nearly five decades, five presidents have tried to completely end these two rebellions, utilizing both force and diplomacy. So far, no combination has succeeded.

Perhaps the most remarkable effort to bring closure to these movements was that of the Ramos Administration, which tried to reach out to both the communist and Muslim rebels through peaceful means. Ramos sat down with the rebel leaders in an attempt to solve both problems at their roots.

History of negotiations

MNLF signs peace pact, fragments the movement 
Even before being elected president, Fidel V. Ramos had actively pursued the assistance of foreign Muslim leaders to solve the problem in Mindanao. Thus, he strongly sought the intercession of Gaddafi because of his instrumental role in the signing of the Tripoli Agreement earlier in 1976. Indeed, with Gaddafi's assistance, the Philippine government was able to sign the Final Peace Agreement with the MNLF in 1996 in what was supposed to be the end of the Moro armed struggle in Mindanao. Misuari was elected governor of the ARMM and was tasked to supervise the implementation of the peace pact.

Unfortunately, other factions within the MNLF were not satisfied with this peace pact and saw this as a deviation from the framework of the Tripoli Agreement. Their desire for complete secession from Philippine sovereignty led to the establishment of the MILF, which will be another challenge to Ramos’ efforts to bring peace in Mindanao after two decades of negotiations with the MNLF.

Ramos negotiates with the MILF, Estrada balks 
The exploratory and preparatory talks between the government and the MILF started in August 1996, followed by low-level negotiations commencing January the following year. An Agreement on General Cessation of Hostilities between the two parties was signed in July 1997.

Ramos’ term as president ended in June 1998, but the low-level negotiations continued under the new administration of President Joseph Ejercito-Estrada. By October 1999 formal peace talks would commence, only to be suspended by Estrada's sudden policy-shift by declaring an "all-out war" against the MILF. Subsequently, the MILF's chairman Salamat declared jihad against Estrada's administration.

Estrada's all-out war policy led to the capture of Camp Abubakar, MILF's main headquarters. The president himself led the military in raising the Philippine flag in the erstwhile rebel stronghold, bringing trucks of lechon (roasted pig) and beer for the triumphant soldiers in what was considered as an insult to the MILF—because pork and alcohol are both prohibited in Islam.

Arroyo resumes peace talks 
When Gloria Macapagal Arroyo assumed the presidency in January 2001, the peace process was revived with a unilateral declaration of ceasefire on the part of the government. With the assistance of the Malaysian government, Presidential Adviser on the Peace Process Eduardo Ermita and MILF Vice-Chair Al Haj Murad Ebrahim signed the Agreement for the General Framework for the Resumption of Peace Talks between the government and the MILF.

On March 31, 2001, Republic Act 9054 lapsed into law without the signature of the president. This law amended the Organic Act of the ARMM to provide for the region's expansion from the original four provinces under its jurisdiction. The Provinces of Basilan, North Cotabato, Davao del Sur, Lanao del Norte, Palawan, Sarangani, South Cotabato, Sultan Kudarat, Zamboanga del Norte, Zamboanga del Sur, Zamboanga Sibugay, and the cities of Cotabato, Dapitan, Dipolog, General Santos, Iligan, Marawi, Pagadian, Puerto Princesa, Zamboanga, Digos, Koronadal, Tacurong, and Kidapawan participated in the plebiscite. However, only Marawi City and Basilan (excluding Isabela City) voted to be included in the ARMM.

Later that year, the peace process fell apart when the military attacked the MILF just a day after the ancestral domain aspect of the Tripoli Agreement was signed in Libya. This attack was based on intelligence reports that the MILF has been aiding the Abu Sayyaf terrorist group, which at that time held some American and Filipino hostages in Basilan. A ceasefire would once again ensue after informal talks between the government and the MILF through the intercession of Malaysia.

On October 29, 2001, the MILF and the MNLF hold unity talks, but this would fall apart barely a month later when Nur Misuari allegedly led a rebellion in Sulu and Zamboanga City to stall the scheduled ARMM elections. A hundred people died in the incident. The government quelled this rebellion and Misuari escaped to Sabah, but the Malaysian government later on deported him back to the Philippines to face rebellion charges. On May 6, 2002, the fourth round of formal peace talks between the government and the MILF resulted in both parties agreeing to veto criminal syndicates and kidnap-for-ransom groups in Mindanao, and to implement the Humanitarian Rehabilitation and Development aspect of the Tripoli Agreement.

A final draft of the peace accord was presented to the leaders of Congress on February 10, 2003, but on the next day, a setback would ensue as the military launched an offensive in Buliok Complex against the MILF which would last for more than a week. Ceasefire was enforced three weeks later. By March, the parties began exploratory talks in Malaysia with a commitment from both sides for a “mutual secession of hostilities.” The aspect of a Muslim ancestral domain was laid down as the next agenda for the peace talks. Until the end of 2008, the peace process remained in a deadlock due to constitutional and legal issues surrounding the ancestral domain aspect.

The Malaysian government on the other side have strongly condemn any terrorist activity and expressed unequivocal support for peace negotiations between Moro rebels and the Philippine government rather than helping the rebels as Malaysia did in 1968 after the Jabidah massacre. During the Conference on Regional Security Meeting held in Makati, Metro Manila in April 2003. Malaysian Defence Minister at the time Najib Razak make a speech on his country intention on the issues:

Muslim Ancestral Domain and the Bangsamoro Juridical Entity 
On July 27, 2008, a Memorandum of Agreement on the Muslim Ancestral Domain (MOA-AD) was finalized in Malaysia. Under this agreement, some 700 villages in Mindanao would hold a referendum within a year to determine if they intend to join the “Bangsamoro Juridical Entity,” an associated state which would be formed after the necessary constitutional amendments are undertaken by the government. This agreement was scheduled to be signed on August 5, with the final peace agreement set to be concluded by November.

Three days before the scheduled signing of the MOA-AD, local officials of North Cotabato filed a case asking the Supreme Court to block the signing of this agreement. On October 14, the Court voted 8–7 to strike down the MOA-AD as unconstitutional. According to the decision penned by Justice Conchita Carpio Morales, “the Constitution does not recognize any state within this country other than the Philippine State, much less does it provide for the possibility of any transitory status to prepare any part of Philippine territory for independence.” Likewise, the Court held as unconstitutional the guarantees under the MOA-AD that the government will implement the necessary constitutional amendments to create a framework for its implementation. According to the Court, the peace panel and even the president do not have the authority to make such guarantees because they do not have the power to propose amendments to the Constitution, such power being vested exclusively in Congress.

The junking of the MOA-AD marked another setback for the peace process, with the armed conflicts for the year 2008 reaching a record-high of 30 incidents in Mindanao. In an effort to salvage the negotiations, Arroyo declared the suspension of military operations against the MILF in July 2009.

Resumption of peace talks under Aquino Presidency 
The administration of Benigno Aquino III resumed peace negotiations, the 20th round, with the MILF in February 2011, after the rebel group announced that they were no longer seeking secession from the Philippines. But the prospects for peace remained elusive as rogue MILF forces conducted sporadic attacks against government forces in several areas in Mindanao despite the existing ceasefire agreement. Worst of these attacks came on October 18, 2011, when MILF forces ambushed an Army contingent in Al-Barka, Basilan killing 19 young soldiers and wounding 12 others. Despite the MILF's half-hearted efforts to make these rogue leaders answer for their attacks, the president and the military hierarchy rejected calls for an all-out-war approach to this problem.

The Al-Barka attack came just two months after Aquino’s controversial meeting with MILF chairman Al Haj Murad Ebrahim in Tokyo. This gave rise to concerns that the real reason for the stalled peace process is not just the government's lukewarm effort to make peace, but also the lack of sincerity of the rebel groups in negotiating lasting peace with the government in Philippines military for 245.

Women in the peace process 
Women played active roles in both the formal and informal negotiations in the Mindanao peace process that brought an end to open hostilities in 2014. Miriam Coronel Ferrer, who led the Filipino government's team in peace negotiations with the MILF, made history in becoming the first woman chief negotiator to sign to a major peace accord in history. Women also held a number of meaningful positions on the negotiating teams of both parties to the conflict. Women reportedly fostered communication between different tracks of negotiations. Civil society groups and women's groups conducted listening workshops for Bangsamoro communities and provided recommendations to the official track I negotiation process.

The resulting peace agreement includes a number of gender-specific considerations for transitional governance and women's empowerment in the future. For example, the agreement includes provisions for women's inclusion in new institutional mechanisms and suggests that women's economic participation is a crucial part of a broad national strategy for growth post-conflict.

On October 15, 2012, the Philippine government signed a much-hyped document touted as the Framework Agreement on the Bangsamoro, which culminates the Aquino Administration's effort to end the deadlock in the peace process. This new document, while merely providing for a general framework for the actual peace negotiations, announces that "the status quo is unacceptable and that the Bangsamoro shall be established to replace the Autonomous Region in Muslim Mindanao (ARMM). The Bangsamoro is the new autonomous political entity (NPE) referred to in the Decision Points of Principles as of April 2012."

According to President Aquino, this is the agreement that "can finally seal genuine, lasting peace in Mindanao."

On January 24, 2014, Philippine government chief negotiator Miriam Coronel Ferer and MILF chief negotiator Mohagher Iqbal signed the final annex of the peace agreement in Kuala Lumpur. Two months later, on March 27, 2014, the Comprehensive Agreement on the Bangsamoro was signed in Manila and witnessed by Philippine President Benigno Aquino III, MILF Chairman Al Haj Murad Ibrahim, and Malaysian Prime Minister Najib Razak. The agreement would pave the way for the creation of the new Muslim autonomous entity called "Bangsamoro" under a law to be approved by the Philippine Congress. The government aims to set up the region by 2016. The agreement calls for Muslim self-rule in parts of the southern Philippines in exchange for a deactivation of rebel forces by the MILF. MILF forces would turn over their firearms to a third party to be selected by the MILF and the Philippine government. A regional police force would be established and the Philippine military would reduce the presence of troops and help disband private armies in the area.

The European Union provided €85 million to further the peace process in August 2020.

References

Further reading
The Long Struggle to Silence the Guns of Rebellion: The CenSEI Report's Review of the Long and Winding Trail to the Elusive Peace Agreements

External links
GPH-MILF Peace Process timeline
Framework Agreement on the Bangsamoro
Annexes of the Framework Agreement on the Bangsamoro
Comprehensive Agreement on the Bangsamoro
Text of all peace accords for the Philippines

 
Islamism in the Philippines
Military history of the Philippines
Peace processes
Politics of the Philippines